The 2017 WNBL Finals was the postseason tournament of the WNBL's 2016–17 season. The Sydney Uni Flames defeated the Dandenong Rangers 2–0, to win their fourth WNBL Championship title.

Playoff qualifying

Bracket

Finals

Semifinals

(1) Sydney Uni Flames vs. (4) Townsville Fire

(2) Dandenong Rangers vs. (3) Perth Lynx

Grand Final

(1) Sydney Uni Flames vs. (2) Dandenong Rangers

Rosters

References

Women's National Basketball League Finals
finals